Primitive is the sixteenth studio album by Neil Diamond. It was released in 1984 on Columbia Records. Its singles "Turn Around", "Sleep With Me Tonight", and "You Make It Feel Like Christmas" reached numbers 4, 24, and 28, respectively on the Billboard Adult Contemporary singles chart, while "Turn Around" also reached number 62 on the Billboard Hot 100 chart.  The album was certified gold by the RIAA on October 5, 1984.

Cash Box described "Turn Around" as "a swelling heart grabber with deft instrumentation to match its emotional lyrics".

The album ushered in a period of creative and commercial decline for Diamond that lasted, to one degree or another, until the release of the 2001 album Three Chord Opera, followed by his collaboration with producer Rick Rubin and the release of 2005's 12 Songs and 2008's Home Before Dark. While Diamond continued having some success and periodic hits, and some television specials and film appearances, the period beginning with the release of Primitive did not have for him the same level of sales, notoriety or fame that the preceding times did.

Track listing

Personnel 
 Neil Diamond – lead vocals, guitar
 Michel Colombier – keyboards (1, 7, 8), arrangements (1, 7, 8), horn and string arrangements (1, 7, 8), conductor (1, 7, 8)
 Robbie Buchanan – synthesizers (1, 7, 8)
 Greg Phillinganes – keyboards (1, 7, 8)
  Tom Hensley – keyboards (2, 3, 4, 9, 10, 11), acoustic piano (2, 3, 4, 9, 10, 11), arrangements (2, 3, 4)
 Alan Lindgren – acoustic piano (2, 3, 4, 9, 10, 11), synthesizers (2, 3, 4, 9, 10, 11), arrangements (2, 9, 10, 11)
 David Foster – Fender Rhodes (5, 6), synthesizers (5, 6), synthesizer arrangements and conductor (6)
 Michael Boddicker – additional synthesizer (5, 6)
 Steve Mitchell – additional synthesizer (5)
 Marty Walsh – guitar (1, 7, 8)
 Richard Bennett – acoustic guitar (2, 3, 4, 9, 10, 11), electric guitar (2, 3, 4, 9, 10, 11)
 Doug Rhone – guitar (2, 3, 4, 9, 10, 11), backing vocals (2, 3, 4, 9, 10, 11)
 George Doering – guitar (5, 6)
 Dennis Herring – guitar (5, 6)
 Neil Stubenhaus – bass (1, 5–8)
 Reinie Press – bass (2, 3, 4, 9, 10, 11)
 John Robinson – drums (1, 5–8)
 Ron Tutt – drums (2, 3, 4, 9, 10, 11), backing vocals (2, 3, 4, 9, 10, 11)
 Vince Charles – percussion (1-4, 7–11)
 Paulinho da Costa – percussion (1, 7, 8)
 King Errisson – percussion (2, 3, 4, 9, 10, 11)
 Lenny Castro – percussion (5, 6)
 Jeremy Lubbock – arrangements (5), string arrangements and conductor (5)
 Steve George – backing vocals (1, 6, 8)
 Richard Page – backing vocals (1, 6, 8)
 Linda Press – backing vocals (2, 3, 4, 9, 10, 11)

Production 
 Producers – Denny Diante (Tracks 1, 7 & 8); Neil Diamond (Tracks 2, 3, 4, 9, 10 & 11); Richard Bennett (Track 4); Richard Perry (Tracks 5 & 6).
 Engineers – George Massenberg (Tracks 1, 7 & 8); Jeremy Smith (Tracks 5 & 6).
  Assistant Engineers – Steve Crimmel (Tracks 1 & 7); Sharon Rice (Tracks 1, 7 & 8); Dave Dubow, Bobby Gerber and Greg Holguin (Tracks 5 & 6).
 Additional Engineers – Michael Brooks and Gabe Veltri (Tracks 5 & 6).
 Recorded at Ocean Way Recording, Westlake Studios, Studio 55, The Complex and Lion Share Recording (Los Angeles, CA); The Mix Room (Burbank, CA).
 Mixing – Allen Sides (Tracks 1 & 7); Mick Guzauski (Track 8).
 Remixing on Tracks 5 & 6 – Jeremy Smith
 Mixed at Ocean Way Recording, Studio 55 and Sunset Sound (Los Angeles, CA).
 Mastered by Mike Reese at The Mastering Lab (Hollywood, CA).
 Production Coordination – Jo Anne McGettrick (Tracks 1, 7 & 8); Sam Cole and Bradford Rosenberger (Tracks 2, 3, 4, 9, 10 & 11).
 Art Direction and Design – David Kirschner
 Additional Design – Jan Weinberg 
 Photography – Norman Seeff

References

1984 albums
Neil Diamond albums
Columbia Records albums